Santee Education Complex is a secondary school located at 1921 South Maple Avenue in Los Angeles, California. Santee, which serves grades nine through 12, is a part of the Los Angeles Unified School District, and is located in the South Los Angeles area.

History 
The campus opened on July 5, 2005 with a three-track, year-round calendar to provide immediate relief for overcrowding at nearby Jefferson High School. It was the first new four-year high school to open in LAUSD in over 35 years. Funding came from a school construction bond issue passed by Los Angeles voters in 2000. Santee was initially under the auspices of Local District 5. Beginning with the 2008/2009 school year, Santee teachers and administrators voted to join the Partnership for Los Angeles Schools, a newly-formed organization dedicated to bringing the best instructional and operational practices into the classrooms of inner-city schools.

Since its opening, Santee has enjoyed steady improvement in its API, CAHSEE scores and graduation rates. Santee's academic progress was also confirmed by the Western Association of Schools and Colleges (WASC) when it awarded the school a three-year accreditation beginning with the 2010–2011 school year.

On June 24, 2011, Santee held its sixth graduation ceremony, featuring a commencement address by Mayor Antonio Villaraigosa.

Academics

Athletics 
Santee has developed a highly successful athletic program that includes league championships in both basketball and track. During the 2009/2010 season, the boys basketball team was undefeated in Southern League play: 13-0. The cross country and track team has consistently dominated meets for the last ten years. In the 2011 Los Angeles City Track Finals, Santee Falcons placed first in the boys 1600m and 3200m races. Falcon girls placed first and second in the 3200m race

Santee Theatre 
The Santee Theatre is a 915-seat indoor theater used for cinemas, musical events, assemblies, and other performing arts events. It has two levels, the floor level and loge level.

References

External links

 Santee Education Complex

Los Angeles Unified School District schools
Educational institutions established in 2005
High schools in Los Angeles
Public high schools in California
2005 establishments in California